Hypselobarbus lithopidos (Canara barb) is a species of ray-finned fish in the genus Hypselobarbus. It is possibly extinct as it has not been recorded since the 1940s and its true taxonomic status needs to be ascertained.

Footnotes

 

lithopidos
Fish described in 1874